The blackish-grey antshrike (Thamnophilus nigrocinereus) is a species of bird in the family Thamnophilidae, the antbirds.

The species is found in Brazil, Colombia, Venezuela, and eastern French Guiana; also a small river region of northeast Bolivia.
Its natural habitats are subtropical or tropical moist lowland forests and subtropical or tropical swamps.  It got its name "blackish-grey antshrike" because of its blackish-grey color, distinguishing it from other antshrikes.

Taxonomy

The blackish-grey antshrike was described by the English zoologist Philip Sclater in 1855 and given the binomial name Thamnophilus nigrocinereus.

Distribution
The blackish-grey antshrike is found in Brazil's southeastern Amazon Basin as well as along the Amazon River proper, and northwards at the Amazon's outlet, into the extreme eastern areas of French Guiana with Brazil's northeast state of Amapá. The southeast range extends slightly southwestward into that quadrant, about 1000–1400 km, and its eastern limit is the final 950 km of the Tocantins River drainage. On the west bordering some of the southwest quadrant, the range is limited by the Madeira River and continues upstream into extreme northeast Bolivia for 75 km in an area around the Madeira and Guaporé River confluence. To the east the range is contiguous and covers the river drainages of the Tapajós, Xingu River, and lower Tocantins River, a range of about 3500 km.

The northwest extension of the range expands from the Amazon River northwestwards upstream on the Rio Negro, (as a river corridor) into eastern and central Colombia, also eastward and north into central and southern Venezuela into the Orinoco River drainage. In the central Orinoco drainage, it does not range away from the river northwards, nor is it found in the lower third of the drainage to the Caribbean.

References

External links
Blackish-gray antshrike photo gallery VIREO Photo-High Res

blackish-grey antshrike
Birds of the Amazon Basin
Birds of Venezuela
Birds of Colombia
blackish-grey antshrike
blackish-grey antshrike
Birds of Brazil
Taxonomy articles created by Polbot